In projective geometry an ovoid is a sphere like pointset (surface) in a projective space of dimension . Simple examples in a real projective space are hyperspheres (quadrics). The essential geometric properties of an ovoid  are:
  Any line intersects  in at most 2 points, 
 The tangents at a point cover a hyperplane (and nothing more), and 
  contains no lines. 
Property 2) excludes degenerated cases (cones,...). Property 3) excludes ruled surfaces (hyperboloids of one sheet, ...).

An ovoid is the spatial analog of an oval in a projective plane.

An ovoid is a special type of a quadratic set.

Ovoids play an essential role in constructing examples of Möbius planes and higher dimensional Möbius geometries.

Definition of an ovoid 
 In a projective space of dimension  a set  of points is called an ovoid, if
 (1) Any line  meets  in at most 2 points.
 (2) At any point  the tangent lines through  cover a hyperplane, the tangent hyperplane, (i.e., a projective subspace of dimension ).
 (3)  contains no lines.

From the viewpoint of the hyperplane sections, an ovoid is a rather homogeneous object, because

For finite projective spaces of dimension  (i.e., the point set is finite, the space is pappian), the following result is true:
 If  is an ovoid in a finite projective space of dimension , then .
(In the finite case, ovoids exist only in 3-dimensional spaces.)
In a finite projective space of order  (i.e. any line contains exactly  points) and dimension  any pointset  is an ovoid if and only if  and no three points are collinear (on a common line).

Replacing the word projective in the definition of an ovoid by affine, gives the definition of an affine ovoid.

Also, any affine ovoid can be considered a projective ovoid in the projective closure (adding a hyperplane at infinity) of the affine space.

Examples

In real projective space (inhomogeneous representation) 
 (hypersphere)

These two examples are quadrics and are projectively equivalent.

Simple examples, which are not quadrics can be obtained by the following constructions:
 (a) Glue one half of a hypersphere to a suitable hyperellipsoid in a smooth way.

Remark: The real examples can not be converted into the complex case (projective space over ). In a complex projective space of dimension  there are no ovoidal quadrics, because in that case any non degenerated quadric contains lines.

But the following method guarantees many non quadric ovoids:
 For any non-finite projective space the existence of ovoids can be proven using transfinite induction.

Finite examples 
 Any ovoid  in a finite projective space of dimension  over a field  of characteristic  is a quadric.

The last result can not be extended to even characteristic, because of the following non-quadric examples:
 For  odd and  the automorphism 
the pointset 
Only when  is the ovoid  a quadric.
 is called the Tits-Suzuki-ovoid.

Criteria for an ovoid to be a quadric 
An ovoidal quadric has many symmetries. In particular:
 Let be  an ovoid in a projective space  of dimension  and  a hyperplane. If the ovoid is symmetric to any point   (i.e. there is an involutory perspectivity with center  which leaves  invariant), then  is pappian and  a quadric.

In the finite case one gets from Segre's theorem:

Generalization: semi ovoid 
Removing condition (1) from the definition of an ovoid results in the definition of a semi-ovoid:
A point set  of a projective space is called a semi-ovoid if
the following conditions hold:
(SO1) For any point  the tangents through point  exactly cover a hyperplane. 
 (SO2)   contains no lines.

A semi ovoid is a special semi-quadratic set which is a generalization of a quadratic set. The essential difference between a semi-quadratic set and a quadratic set is the fact, that there can be lines which have 3 points in common with the set and the lines are not contained in the set.

Examples of semi-ovoids are the sets of isotropic points of an hermitian form. They are called hermitian quadrics.

As for ovoids in literature there are criteria, which make a semi-ovoid to a hermitian quadric.
See, for example.

Semi-ovoids are used in the construction of examples of Möbius geometries.

See also 
Ovoid (polar space)
 Möbius plane

Notes

References

Further reading

External links 
 E. Hartmann: Planar Circle Geometries, an Introduction to Moebius-, Laguerre- and Minkowski Planes. Skript, TH Darmstadt (PDF; 891 kB), S. 121-123.

Projective geometry
Incidence geometry